Dorrance Field is the on-campus soccer and lacrosse stadium at the University of North Carolina in Chapel Hill, North Carolina.

The stadium was constructed on the site of the old Fetzer Field.  Construction on the new field began in May 2017 and the stadium opened on March 2, 2019.

The field was named after longtime women's soccer coach Anson Dorrance, officially dedicated on September 29, 2019.

See also
North Carolina Tar Heels
North Carolina Tar Heels men's soccer
North Carolina Tar Heels women's soccer
North Carolina Tar Heels men's lacrosse
North Carolina Tar Heels women's lacrosse

References

Athletics (track and field) venues in North Carolina
Chapel Hill-Carrboro, North Carolina
Lacrosse venues in North Carolina
Soccer venues in North Carolina
College lacrosse venues in the United States
College soccer venues in the United States
2019 establishments in North Carolina
Sports venues completed in 2019
North Carolina Tar Heels sports venues